Germany national under-16 football team is the official representative of Germany in European competitions in its category and is managed by the German football Association.

It plays European championship in his class and friendly matches and played games until 2014.

Players 
Current Squads

Resources

Notes 
1-This article differs from the article on the German national youth team,which is the U-19 category,this is U-16.

References

Youth football in Germany
Football
European national under-16 association football teams